Tiznit is a province in the Moroccan economic region of Souss-Massa. Its population in 2004 was 344,831.

The major cities and towns are:
 Tafraout
 Tiznit

Subdivisions
The province is divided administratively into the following municipalities and communes:

References

Tiznit
Tiznit Province